Gør det Noget is Danish rock group Gasolin's seventh studio album. When Gasolin' released Gør det Noget in November 1977 (translation: "does it matter" or "so what"), they knew it was their last album. After the ambitious Gas 5 and Efter endnu en dag, Gasolin' decided to make a garage-rock album. Therefore, the service of Roy Thomas Baker was not needed and Gør det Noget was produced by Gasolin' and "Rocco" Tommy Bogs.

The sound on Gør det Noget is raw and thunderous and songs such as "Jumbo Number Nul" and "Kina Rock" sounds like Sex Pistols. Sentimental ballads like "Kattemor" and "Længes Hjem" has a rawness due to the minimalist production, but all the songs are still very catchy. Especially "Det bedste til mig og mine venner" and "Strengelegen". From this album "Jumbo Nummer Nul" / "Kattemor" and "Kina Rock" / "Længes Hjem" were released as singles.

Gør det Noget was recorded in Sweet Silence Studio in Copenhagen and engineered by Freddy Hansson and Flemming Rasmussen. Flemming Rasmussen would go on to produce Metallica.
Gør det Noget was released on CD in 1989. It was remastered and included on The Black Box box set in 2003.

Track listing

All songs written by Gasolin', lyrics by Gasolin' and Mogens Mogensen except where noted

"Det bedste til mig og mine venner" - 4:24
"Smukke Møller" - 2:20
"Jumbo nummer nul" - 3:25
"December i New York" - 2:26
"Place Sct. Michelle" - 3:03
"Strengelegen" (Gasolin') - 3:55
"Get on the Train" (Gasolin'/Gasolin'-O. Ahlstrup-M. Mogensen) - 2:17
"Kattemor" - 3:25
"Bob-shi-bam" (Gasolin'/Gasolin'-M. Parkvist-M. Mogensen) - 3:53
"Længes hjem" - 3:00
"Gør det noget" - 3:02
"Kina rock" (Gasolin') - 3:00

Credits

Gasolin'

Franz Beckerlee - guitar, moog, e-bow, vocals
Wili Jønsson - bass, vocals, piano
Kim Larsen - vocals, guitar, piano
Søren Berlev - drums, vocals
Recorded and mixed in Sweet Silence Studio during September 1977
Engineered by Freddy Hansson and Flemming Rasmussen
Produced by Rocco and his brothers (original credit)

References

Gasolin' albums
1977 albums
Columbia Records albums
Danish-language albums